The purple-throated fruitcrow (Querula purpurata) is a species of bird in the family Cotingidae, the cotingas. It is the only species of the genus Querula. It is native to Nicaragua, Costa Rica, Panama, and most of the northern half of South America, its habitat being humid lowland forest where it feeds mainly on insects and fruit. It is a glossy black, medium-sized bird and the male has a purple-red throat patch. It nests in close vicinity with other birds of its species. Its population is in decline, but it is a common species with a very wide range, and the International Union for Conservation of Nature has assessed its conservation status as being of "least concern".

Description
It is a stout medium-sized glossy-black bird. Males have a large purple-red upper throat patch, (similar to the gorget of the hummingbirds), extending to the side of the neck. It has a short wide pointed grayish bill, black eyes, and gray legs.

Distribution and habitat
It is found in Bolivia, Brazil, Colombia, Ecuador, French Guiana, Guyana, Peru, Suriname, and Venezuela; also in southern Central America in Nicaragua, Costa Rica and Panama. Its natural habitat is subtropical or tropical moist lowland forests.

The purple-throated fruitcrow ranges across northern South America, with populations west of the Andes cordillera extending into Central America to Nicaragua. It goes from the Guianas and Maranhão state, northeastern Brazil in the east, and throughout the Amazon basin to the Andes foothills in the west; it is only absent in the Amazon Basin in the northeast and north central bordering the Guiana Highlands and southern Venezuela; otherwise the range is contiguous east of the Andes. Its population trend is thought to be downwards but it is a common species with a very wide range and the International Union for Conservation of Nature has assessed its conservation status as being of "least concern".

Behavior
Despite its name, the purple-throated fruitcrow feeds on insects as well as fruit, moving through the forest canopy in small chattering groups. It also nests colonially, with little attempt to hide the nests which are rendered more conspicuous by the noisy group of birds nearby.

References

External links
Purple-throated fruitcrow media. The Internet Bird Collection.
Purple-throated fruitcrow photo gallery. VIREO: Visual Resources for Ornithology. The Academy of Natural Sciences, Drexel University.

purple-throated fruitcrow
Birds of Costa Rica
Birds of Panama
Birds of Colombia
Birds of the Tumbes-Chocó-Magdalena
Birds of the Guianas
Birds of the Amazon Basin
purple-throated fruitcrow
Birds of Brazil
Taxonomy articles created by Polbot